The term ecological station may refer to

Ecological station (Brazil), a category of strictly protected conservation units in Brazil
Nature reserve, a more or less protected area in other countries